KJNP-TV, virtual channel 4 (UHF digital channel 20), is a TBN-affiliated television station serving Fairbanks, Alaska, United States that is licensed to North Pole. Owned by the Evangelistic Alaska Missionary Fellowship, it is sister to radio stations KJNP (1170 AM) and KJNP-FM (100.3). The three stations share studios near Mission Road on the northeast side of North Pole; KJNP-TV's transmitter is located on the Ester Dome.

History
Signing on on December 7, 1981, and becoming a TBN affiliate in 1990 (and its only full-power affiliate in Alaska), KJNP-TV became the fourth television station in the Fairbanks area after KUAC. Originally broadcasting 16 hours a day, the schedule expanded to 24 hours a day in 2003, following the installation of a new transmitter.

KJNP-TV and KJNP-AM-FM (which launched in 1967) were founded by Don and Gen Nelson. In addition to TBN and other programs, KJNP-TV also broadcasts Closing Comments, one of the longest-running public affairs programs on local television.

Digital television

Digital channel

Analog-to-digital conversion
KJNP-TV shut down its analog signal, over VHF channel 4, on June 12, 2009, the official date in which full-power television stations in the United States transitioned from analog to digital broadcasts under federal mandate. The station's digital signal remained on its pre-transition UHF channel 20. Through the use of PSIP, digital television receivers display the station's virtual channel as its former VHF analog channel 4.

See also
 KJNP (AM)
 KJNP-FM

References

External links
 

1981 establishments in Alaska
Television channels and stations established in 1981
JNP-TV
Trinity Broadcasting Network affiliates
North Pole, Alaska